Rekha Kumari Jha is a Nepali politician and a member of the House of Representatives of the federal parliament of Nepal. She was elected from CPN UML under the proportional representation system filling the seat reserved for women and madhesi groups.

References

Living people
Place of birth missing (living people)
21st-century Nepalese women
21st-century Nepalese politicians
Nepal Communist Party (NCP) politicians
Communist Party of Nepal (Unified Marxist–Leninist) politicians
Nepal MPs 2017–2022
1975 births